The Urban Institute based in Edinburgh, Scotland is a collaboration of researchers at Heriot-Watt University and the University of Edinburgh on urban issues. It was founded in 2016 under the leadership of professor Dr. Mark Stephens. The institute runs a number of research projects in Edinburgh. It also offers joint post-graduate programs accredited by RTPI and RICS. The Urban Institute is part of the UK Collaborative Centre for Housing Evidence, one of the four centres in UK.

References

Organizations established in 2016
Organisations based in Edinburgh
Urban planning